María Esther Corán was an Argentine actress. She starred in films such Fúlmine (1949), El nieto de Congreve (1949), La melodía perdida (1952),  Marta Ferrari (1956) and El ayudante (1971). One of her best known roles was in the 1961 TV series Viendo a Biondi, co-starring Pepe Biondi. In 1997 she was honored with the Día del Actor award for her 50-year career.

Filmography

 Juan que reía (1976)
 Los chantas (1975) ...
 La gran aventura  (1974) 
 El ayudante  (1971) 
 P.K. en Buenos Aires  (1968) 
 Operación San Antonio (1968)
 Con el más puro amor (1966)  (filmed in 1955)
 Una jaula no tiene secretos (1962)
 Libertad bajo palabra (1961) ...
 ...Y el demonio creó a los hombres (1960)
 Yo quiero vivir contigo (1960) ...Women on train
 Sábado a la noche, cine  (1960) 
 El secuestrador (1958)
 Cinco gallinas y el cielo (1957)
 Catita es una dama (1956) ...Doña Anunciata
 Marta Ferrari (1956) 
 Mi marido y mi novio (1955) 
 Sinfonía de juventud (1955) 
 Torrente indiano (1954) 
 Barrio gris (1954) ...Verdulera
 Su seguro servidor (1954)
 Veraneo en Mar del Plata (1954)
 La patrulla chiflada (1952)
 La melodía perdida (1952)
 Mi divina pobreza (1951)
 Cinco locos en la pista (1950)
 La barra de la esquina (1950) ...Doña Andrea
 Fúlmine (1949)
 El nieto de Congreve (1949) ...Rosaura
 Hombres a precio (1949)
 Mujeres que bailan (1949)
 La caraba (1948) 
 Villa Rica del Espíritu Santo (1945)
 La importancia de ser ladrón (1944)

References

Argentine film actresses
1910 births
1997 deaths